Domenico Antonio Bernardini (1647 – January 1723) was a Roman Catholic prelate who served as Bishop of Mileto (1696–1723) and Bishop of Castellaneta (1677–1696).

Biography
Domenico Antonio Bernardini was born in Lecce, Italy in 1647 and ordained a priest on 25 August 1668.
On 26 April 1677, he was appointed during the papacy of Pope Innocent XI as Bishop of Castellaneta.
On 1 May 1677, he was consecrated bishop by Bernardino Rocci, Bishop of Orvieto, with Pier Antonio Capobianco, Bishop Emeritus of Lacedonia, Girolamo Barzellini, Bishop of Cariati e Cerenzia, serving as co-consecrators. 
On 18 June 1696, he was appointed during the papacy of Pope Innocent XII as Bishop of Mileto.
He served as Bishop of Mileto until his death in January 1723.

While bishop, he was the principal co-consecrator of José Guerrero de Torres, Bishop of Gaeta (1693) .

References

External links and additional sources
 (for Chronology of Bishops) 
 (for Chronology of Bishops) 
 (for Chronology of Bishops) 
 (for Chronology of Bishops) 

17th-century Italian Roman Catholic bishops
18th-century Italian Roman Catholic bishops
Bishops appointed by Pope Innocent XI
Bishops appointed by Pope Innocent XII
1647 births
1723 deaths
People from Mileto